Dildar is a masculine given name.  It may refer to:

 Dildar (actor) (1945–2003), Bangladeshi film actor
 Dildar (poet) (1918–1948), Kurdish poet and political activist

Given name
 Dildar Ali Naseerabadi (1753–1820), Shia scholar of India
 Dildar Hussain (born 1957), Pakistani Tabla player
 Dildar Pervaiz Bhatti (1940–1994), Pakistani TV host
 Dildar Awan (1928–2000), Pakistani cricketer
 Dildar Ahmed, Pakistani heavyweight boxer
 Dildar khan abbasi, Senior Pakistani journalist and editor of the International Press of Pakistan (1968–2020)

See also
 Dildarnagar, a town and a nagar panchayat in the Ghazipur district of Uttar Pradesh, India
 Meray Qatil Meray Dildar, a 2011 Hum TV teledrama